Mimi is a 2021 Indian Hindi-language comedy-drama film directed by Laxman Utekar and produced by Dinesh Vijan under Maddock Films. A remake of the 2011 Marathi film Mala Aai Vhhaychy!, it stars Kriti Sanon in the eponymous lead who opts to be a surrogate mother for a foreign couple. Pankaj Tripathi, Sai Tamhankar, Manoj Pahwa, Supriya Pathak, Evelyn Edwards and Aidan Whytock appear in supporting roles.

Mimi was announced in August 2019 and began shooting in October 2019 with filming taking place in Rajasthan and Mumbai. The film score and soundtrack were composed by A. R. Rahman, with lyrics penned by Amitabh Bhattacharya; cinematography and editing were respectively handled by Akash Agarwal and Manish Pradhan, the latter of whom had also edited Utekar's Luka Chuppi (2019) that also starred Sanon.

Following the non-existent theatrical releases due to COVID-19 pandemic, Mimi was later planned for a digital release through the streaming services Netflix and JioCinema on 30 July 2021. However, the film was released through the platforms on 26 July 2021, 4 days prior as the film was released accidentally by JioCinema and went into torrent sites. It received positive reviews from critics with praise directed to the cast's performances, in particular Sanon, Tripathi, and Tamhankar. At the 67th Filmfare Awards, Mimi won Best Actress (Sanon), Best Supporting Actor (Tripathi) and Best Supporting Actress (Tamhankar).

Plot 
John and Summer are an American couple who cannot conceive. They visit Rajasthan in search of a surrogate mother. Upon meeting local dancer and aspiring actress Mimi Rathod, they feel she would be a perfect surrogate for their child. Mimi, who wishes for stardom in Bollywood and goes to Mumbai but doesn't have the financial means required to chase her dreams, agrees after initial hesitation. The IVF procedure succeeds and Mimi becomes pregnant with John and Summer's child. In order to hide the pregnancy from her parents, Mimi lies to them that she is going to Mumbai for 9 months for the shoot of a film. She starts living with her friend Shama. Bhanu is asked by John and Summer to take care of Mimi during her pregnancy.

7 months later
A routine check-up reveals that Mimi's unborn child has down syndrome, leaving John and Summer devastated. They abruptly leave for USA, saying they don't want the baby anymore and suggest Mimi to abort it. Disheartened, Mimi rejects the idea of abortion and decides to carry the child to term. Visibly pregnant now, Mimi returns home and lies that the child belongs to Bhanu when asked about its father, causing more problems as Bhanu's wife lives in Delhi who hasn't seen him for months.

Mimi gives birth to a healthy boy Raj, revealing the earlier test result was false and also evoking curiosity and bafflement among people because of the child's fair skin, which didn't resemble his supposed biological parents, making him a locally adored wonder. When Bhanu's family shows up in Rajasthan, confusion and chaos ensue. Eventually, Mimi comes clean about the surrogacy and her family accepts the child. She becomes deeply attached to Raj, giving up her Bollywood aspirations to care for him.

4 years later
Raj has grown up as a kid, doted upon by Mimi's parents and also attracting attention and sometimes bullying from his schoolmates for his 'different' looks. John and Summer return to India after seeing a video of Mimi and Raj on Facebook. They say that they've changed their mind and want to take Raj back to America. Mimi confronts Summer, saying Raj is her child now, and refuses to give him back. However, John threatens legal action as Mimi had signed surrogacy contract and has no legal right over Raj as long as she was paid for her services. Bhanu and Mimi's parents prepare to fight it out in court, but Mimi rejects this notion and decides to give Raj back to John and Summer as she doesn't want Raj to face the struggle of court cases.

On the day of John and Summer's flight back to America; Mimi, Bhanu, and her family meet the couple to send Raj off with them but are surprised to see John with a child Tara, who Summer claims as their daughter. It is revealed that while coming back from Mimi's house, they came across an orphanage and felt a connection with Tara, who they saw crying from behind the orphan gate, and adopted her. Summer explains how after seeing Mimi with Raj, she realized parenthood has nothing to do with blood but everything to do with love and care. They leave Raj with Mimi and her family, recognizing he is her son in every practical sense and belongs with her.

Cast
 Kriti Sanon as Mimi Rathore / Chand (Fake), an aspiring actress who becomes a surrogate to earn money for fulfilling her dreams
 Pankaj Tripathi as Bhanu Pratap Pandey / Naseeruddin (Fake), a taxi driver, Mimi's friend
 Sai Tamhankar as Shama, Mimi's best friend
 Manoj Pahwa as Maan Singh Rathore, Mimi's father, Shobha's husband 
 Supriya Pathak as Shobha Rathore, Mimi's mother, Maan's wife
 Evelyn Edwards as Summer Roger, Raj's biological mother, Tara's adoptive mother
 Aidan Whytock as John Roger, Raj's biological father, Tara's adoptive father
 Jacob Smith as Raj Rathore, Mimi's adoptive son, Summer and John's biological son
 Jaya Bhattacharya as Dr. Asha Desai, Mimi's doctor
 Atmaja Pandey as Rekha Pandey, Bhanu's wife
 Nutan Surya as Kaikeyi Pandey, Bhanu's mother
 Amardeep Jha as Mausi Amma
 Sheikh Ishaque Mohammad as Aatif Alam, Maan's music student
 Pankaj Jha as Dilshad Ahmed
 Narottam Bain as Tailor Farookh Shaikh
 Gyan Prakash as Maulwi Sahab, Shama's father
 Anil Bhagwat as Lawyer Ashok Bharadwaj
 Nadeem Khan as Jolly Singh

Production

Development 
In April 2019, The Times of India reported that Kriti Sanon will lead in a film that will revolve around surrogacy. Dinesh Vijan's production house Maddock Films was reported to back the project. The film was officially announced in August 2019 followed by a poster release and Sanon and Pankaj Tripathi were reported to feature in lead roles. It was further confirmed to be based on the Marathi film Mala Aai Vhhayachy (2011). In an interview with India Today, Dinesh Vijan stated that Mimi was a tale based on true events unlike poignant stories. For him, the film explores a beautiful relationship between a woman who never wanted to be a mother and one who can't wait to be one. The unexpected part was called "humor" in the storyline by him. Sanon added: "You will have a lot of humour and situational humour. At the same time, there are a lot of characters you will take back home." For Sanon, Mimi was the film which she signed hearing the idea but not the script. Later, realising that the role has a lot to offer to her as an actor. She gained fifteen kilograms of body weight to fit into the character of a pregnant woman. In an interview with Hindustan Times, she was quoted: "We had to shoot the pregnancy scenes and Laxman Sir was very clear that it was necessary to gain weight for those scenes because he didn't want the character to have a chiseled face". Actress Sai Tamhankar was roped into playing a pivotal character in the film, sharing screen with Tripathi. She was reported to play a Muslim woman from Rajasthan, hence learnt Urdu as well as the Rajasthani dialect for her role.

Filming 
Principal photography commenced at Mandawa, Rajasthan by 29 October 2019. In an interview with Filmfare, Sanon confirmed it to be her first female centric film. By December 2019, the team had completed 40% of the film's production. The next filming schedule was planned from February 2020 for 30–40 days. Filming took place in Jaipur on 10 February 2020, where makers finished shooting major sequences within 4 March 2020. Reportedly, filming was stalled for a few days due to COVID-19 pandemic induced lockdown in India. In June 2020, Utekar confirmed that five days shoot was pending which included an introductory song featuring artists from United Kingdom. The song (later deciphered as "Param Sundari") was planned to be filmed by January 2021. He added that owing to the pandemic situations, big crew and cast traveling back to Rajasthan was not feasible. The international cast was called to Mumbai for the shoot as they were required for the continuity of the film. By May 2021, it was revealed that the entire shooting process has been completed.

Soundtrack 

The original score and soundtrack were composed by A. R. Rahman and featured lyrics written by Amitabh Bhattacharya. Vipin Nair of Music Aloud wrote in its review that "the soundtrack had fairly low expectations, but it had thrown up a surprise with a very diverse and engaging set of songs" and gave 3.5 out of 5. A critic from The Humming Heart gave a score 8 (out of 10) and said "Mimi may not be a top-shelf Hindi mainstream soundtrack of AR Rahman. But, this is a lovely low-key album with tunes that might pay off with revisits in the years to come."

Release 
Producer Dinesh Vijan had planned for a theatrical release in March 2021 after his production Roohi, which was the first mainstream Hindi film to have a theatrical release post COVID-19 pandemic. However, following the nationwide lockdown due to rise in COVID-19 cases and the second wave of the pandemic, the makers planned for a digital release in May 2021. The film was distributed worldwide by Netflix and JioCinema (the digital platform for Jio Studios, which co-produced the film) additionally distributed the film in India, with a scheduled release date of 30 July 2021. However, four days before the release, the platform JioCinema released the film earlier for few minutes on 26 July 2021, and resulted in online piracy as it was made available for torrent sites and illegal movie streaming platforms. To counter piracy, both Netflix and JioCinema premiered the film on the same date instead of 30 July.

Reception 
On the review aggregator website Rotten Tomatoes, the film holds a rating of 25% based on 12 reviews.

Renuka Vyahare of The Times of India gave 4 (out of 5) stars and said "Mimi picks a relevant topic and turns it into an engaging, empowering and compassionate tale on humanity and motherhood". Taran Adarsh, in his review for Bollywood Hungama, wrote "Mimi is a heartwarming saga, aimed at families and it will keep the audience thoroughly entertained. Had it released in cinemas, it had a good chance of becoming a success", giving a rating of 3.5 stars out of five. Sushri Sahu of Mashable India too gave 3.5 stars describing the film as an "feel-good family entertainer" and wrote, "Mimi is a family entertainer that might make you cry, laugh and smile all at the same time; If you're into that, you will enjoy Mimi, which is enriched by Sanon and Tripathi's performances". Calling Sanon's performance in Mimi her career-best, she further wrote, "Sanon has outdone herself. In fact, as you see her shoulder the film with her craft, you will also see her deliver her career-best performance; Mimi is Sanon's labour of love all the way".

Anupama Chopra of Film Companion wrote "Mimi is content to operate at a simplistic, superficial level. Laxman puts together a roster of terrific actors, but Mimi rests on Kriti's shoulders. She also works hard – putting on weight, working with a Rajasthani accent. In the climax, she is able to summon a wellspring of emotion but largely, her efforts are undermined by the script and her own inability to let go of synthetic Bollywood glamour."
Jyoti Kanyal of India Today gave 2.5 (out of 5) and said "Mimi is a great attempt at bringing a social taboo like surrogacy to the center stage. However, in trying to make it more entertaining and emotional, the makers lost a good opportunity. The film has some really funny scenes, and if melodrama is something you don't mind, you should definitely give Mimi a watch".  Anna M. M. Vetticad of Firstpost gave 1.5 (out of 5) saying "Writer-director Laxman Utekar's new Hindi film is a muddled take on motherhood with clarity only on its conservative mission to condemn abortion. If it had been better written and directed, Mimi might have been considered dangerous anti-women propaganda. To describe it thus would be a compliment though to the director's storytelling abilities".

Awards and nominations

References

External links 
 
 Mimi at Bollywood Hungama

2021 films
2020s pregnancy films
Indian comedy-drama films
Hindi remakes of Marathi films
Films about surrogacy
Indian pregnancy films
Indian direct-to-video films
2021 direct-to-video films